Loretta Blake (April 17, 1898 – July 30, 1981) was an American film actress. She appeared in several films between 1914 and 1921.

Early life
Loretta Blake was born on April 17, 1898, at Akron, Ohio. She attended Saint Mary's Convent in Akron for five years before moving to Los Angeles to live with her grandparents where she finished her education.

Career
She joined the famous D. W. Griffith organization without previous experience. Several of her girlfriends were in picture work and she had dropped around to the studio with one of them one day out of curiosity. She cheerfully accepted an offer to do a small role for pin money and when the director saw her appearance she was hired immediately.  She was dainty at five feet two inches and 115 pounds. She married actor, director, and agent Nat G. Deverich. They had one child, Albert Douglas Deverich.

Death
She died on July 30, 1981, at Los Angeles, California. Her resting place is San Fernando Mission Cemetery, Mission Hills CA, Section D, Lot 302, Grave 3.

Selected filmography

 At Dawn (1914)*short
 Baby's Ride (1914)*short
 Branch Number Thirty-Seven (1915)*short
 Probation (1915)*short
 The Sea Brat (1915)*short
 The Broken Lullaby (1915)*short
 His Last Deal (1915)*short
 The Double Crossing of Slim (1915)*short
 The Black Sheep (1915/II)*short
 The Absentee (1915)
 11:30 P.M. (1915)*short
 Ghosts (1915)
 The Sable Lorcha (1915)
 Ghosts (1915)
 The Eternal Grind (1916)
 His Picture in the Papers (1916)
 The Little Princess (1917)
 One Hundred Percent American (1918)*short
 Just Out of College (1920)

References

External links
 
 
 

1898 births
1964 deaths
Burials at San Fernando Mission Cemetery
American film actresses
American silent film actresses
20th-century American actresses
Actresses from Ohio
People from Akron, Ohio